Ozark Mountain State Park is an undeveloped public recreation area covering  in Taney County, Missouri. The state park is closed pending public input on future uses of the land. It was one of three new parks announced by Governor Jay Nixon in December 2016. It shares a border with the Ruth and Paul Henning Conservation Area and is traversed by more than two miles of Roark Creek, including a stretch of the three-mile-long East Fork Roark Creek. The site includes a one-room schoolhouse that served the former community of Garber.

References

External links
Ozark Mountain State Park Missouri Department of Natural Resources
Ozark Mountain State Park Map Missouri Department of Natural Resources

State parks of Missouri
Protected areas of Taney County, Missouri
Protected areas established in 2016
2016 establishments in Missouri